Natoker Moto - Like a Play (2015) is a Bengali film directed by Debesh Chattopadhyay based on the Life and Struggle of a Legendary Actress of Calcutta which still impress the Theatre Movement of India.

Synopsis
This film is about the journey of Kheya, a theatre artist and her multi-dimensional experience as a girl, as a woman and even as an artist. It is more so when especially a woman is of maverick capability and of excellence beyond her time. While the film depicts the scenario of Kolkata's socio-cultural circuit spanning from 1950 to 1970s, it aspires to bring about the struggles and conflicts that a female artist has to go through even after two decades of globalization. The film, through an investigation of sudden demise of an extremely reputed actress’ death delves into an ongoing search behind the causes of ceaseless conflicts a female artist has to confront and is made to remain submissive in the paradigm of male domination. The film intends to get into precise details of the artist's life so as to expose the obstructions, understand the strength of creative aspirations, and to ablaze with the delightful journey of the artistic soul that unfortunately got cut short. However, this film is envisaged to be in coherence with the belief in the unending journey of the artist who still remains alive with the lively river and the living art.

Awards
FCCI Award for Best Debut Director (Natoker Moto) at HBFF-2016  Citation: “For the sensitive cinematic portrayal of the struggle of a dedicated artistic soul in a powerful visual odyssey that reinforces cinema, theater and lived life.” Jury members: Siladitya Sen, Madhu Eravankara, and Dalton L

Cast
Paoli Dam as Kheya
Roopa Ganguly as Kheya's Mother
Rajatava Dutta as The Investigating Officer
Saswata Chatterjee as Prasad 
Bratya Basu as Amitesh
Sujan Mukherjee as Manoranjan
Ushasie Chakraborty as Sabita Sinha
Saayoni Ghosh as Kheya's Friend
Bhashkar Bannerjee

See also
Film Critics Circle of India
Hyderabad Bengali Film Festival

References

External links
 

Bengali-language Indian films
2010s Bengali-language films
2015 films
Films set in Kolkata